The North Kerry Senior Football Championship is a Gaelic football competition for GAA clubs affiliated to the North Kerry Division of Kerry. The official name of the competition is The Bernard O'Callaghan Memorial North Kerry Senior Football Championship, in honour of the late Bernie O'Callaghan (Beale) who was Chairman of the North Kerry GAA Board for 25 years (1974 to 1998) and did a huge amount of work for North Kerry football. The Championship runs from October to December each year but has on occasion continued into the New Year due to replays and postponements. Fourteen clubs are eligible to play in the Championship: Asdee, Ballydonoghue, Ballyduff, Ballylongford, Beale, Brosna, Castleisland Desmonds, Duagh, Finuge, Knocknagoshel, Listowel Emmets, Moyvane, St. Senan's and Tarbert. The Championship is played on a straight knock-out basis. First round games give home advantage to first drawn out in ties following an open draw, with all further round matches being played at neutral venues.

Moyvane have been the most successful team in the Championship with 18 titles. The prize for the winners is the Eamon O'Donoghue Memorial Cup. Named after the Asdee native who starred for the great Ballylongford team of the 1960s and 1970s. The current (2021) holders of the cup are Castleisland Desmonds who defeated Ballyduff, winning the competition for the second consecutive year.

2014 Championship

All fourteen clubs entered the Championship this year. Two teams received byes through to the Quarter-Finals with the remaining clubs being drawn to play in the First Round.

Roll of honour

Finals

See also
East Kerry Senior Football Championship
Mid Kerry Senior Football Championship
West Kerry Senior Football Championship

References

2011 final report

Gaelic football competitions in County Kerry